Andrew William Dougall (22 May 1884 – 11 November 1941) was an Australian rules footballer who played for the Carlton Football Club in the Victorian Football League (VFL).

Change of name
He enlisted in the first AIF under the name of James Davidson (the reason for this decision has never been explained); and, it seems, he went under that name for the rest of his life.

Family
The son of Scottish migrants, William Dougall (1855-1929)  and Mary Dougall (1856-1904), née Mitchell, he was born in Melbourne on 22 May 1884. He married Rita Isobel Ridley (1894-), née Law (under the name "Andrew William Dougall") in South Australia in 1931.

One brother, Lieutenant Norman Dougall (1887-1917) — who attended Geelong College (1898-1902), and served in the First AIF, was also awarded the Military Cross in 1917 ("for conspicuus gallantry and devotion to duty") — was killed in action at Bullecourt on 6 May 1917.

A second brother, Major John Mitchell Dougall (1879-1926), who had served with the 79th Cameron Highlanders in the Boer War, also served in the First AIF.

Education
He attended Geelong College. He studied at the University of Melbourne for at least one term.

Football
He played two First XVIII matches for Carlton Football Club: on 12 July 1902 (round 11), on the wing, against Melbourne, and, in the last of the home-and-away matches for the season, on 2 August 1902 (round 14), in the forward pocket, against Collingwood. He competed as a half-miler for Coburg Harriers for many years.

Military service
He enlisted in the First AIF, on 30 August 1914; and, among the first to land at Gallipoli in 25 April 1915, he sustained a bullet wound in his right forearm (he was removed to Cairo for treatment, and rejoined his regiment at Gallipoli on 22 June 1915). With the rank of Lieutenant (he was a Temporary Captain), he was awarded the Military Cross in 1919.

Death
He died in Hilton, South Australia on 11 November 1941. His death notice identified him as "James Davidson".

Notes

References

External links 

	
Andrew Dougall's profile at Blueseum

1884 births
Australian rules footballers from Melbourne
Carlton Football Club players
People educated at Geelong College
Australian military personnel of World War I
Australian recipients of the Military Cross
1941 deaths
Military personnel from Melbourne
Australian people of Scottish descent